Gyrinophilus, the spring salamanders, are a genus of salamanders in the family Plethodontidae. The genus is endemic to the Appalachian Mountains of the eastern United States and Canada. Their habitat is under rocks in cold, clear springs, in wet caves, and in streams in forested areas.

Species
This genus consists of four species:

References

 
Amphibians of North America
Extant Pleistocene first appearances
Amphibian genera
Taxa named by Edward Drinker Cope
Taxonomy articles created by Polbot